Trauma means hit or stroke. This hit can be physical or it can be mental. After having experienced the incidences of violence the women victims become afraid, often they cry and try to commit suicide as immediate response. As a result, their regular activates impaired. To get rid of this situation the Multi-Sectoral Programme on Violence against Women (MSP-VAW), under the Ministry of Women and Children Affairs with the joint initiative of the Government of Bangladesh and Denmark , established the National Trauma Counseling Centre (NTCC).
From this centre, women, children and adolescents who has experienced any kind of violence, get mental health services totally free of cost. NTCC offers individual, couple, family and group counseling according to client's need basis. Beside this, this centre also conducts different type's psychosocial counseling training for Human Resource Development as a skilled Counselor. It also plays a vital role to make a strong network among all the mental health service provider organizations.

History
Multi-Sectoral Programme on Violence against Women conducts a survey 2007 on the survivors of violence against women at One-Stop Crisis Centre. It was found that 91% of the One-Stop Crisis Centre's clients suffer from anxiety at a clinical level and 81.40% suffer from depression in a clinical level and need needs psycho-social counseling. For this reason, the Honorable Speaker (Ex-State Minister of Ministry of Women and Children Affairs) Dr. Shirin Sharmin Chowdhury, MP inaugurated this centre on 10 August 2009. This is an epoch making initiative from the government, to ensure mental health service to the women and children of violence victim.

Objective 

 Provide psychosocial counseling support to violence against women and children totally free of cost
  Conduct different type's psychosocial counseling training for Human Resource Development.
 Monitoring and supervise the psychosocial counseling services of Regional Trauma Counseling Centre, One-Stop Crisis Centre and One-Stop Crisis Cell.
 Organize awareness raising program for changing mindset of the people by establishing strong network with government, non-government and development partners’ organizations.

Service Related Information 
1.It remains open from Sunday to Thursday from 9 am to 5 pm except government holiday

2. Appointments or time for Counseling Session is given over phone of face to face contact.

3.  There is no charge for counseling session

4. The types of mental health service is depends on the nature and severity of the client's problems

5. Women, children and adolescent from anywhere have the opportunity to get psychotherapy or psycho-social counseling service for his or her mental, emotional, behavioral problems

References



1976 establishments in Bangladesh
Organisations based in Dhaka
Government agencies of Bangladesh